The following television stations broadcast on digital channel 21 in the United States:

 K21AC-D in Victorville, etc., California, on virtual channel 21
 K21AM-D in Ninilchick, etc., Alaska
 K21BG-D in Jacksonville, Oregon
 K21CA-D in Plains, Montana
 K21CC-D in Lewiston, Idaho
 K21DE-D in Seaside-Astoria, Oregon, on virtual channel 12, which rebroadcasts KPTV
 K21DG-D in St. James, Minnesota
 K21DO-D in Palm Springs, California
 K21EF-D in Pitkin, Colorado, on virtual channel 2
 K21EG-D in Golden Valley, Arizona
 K21EI-D in Beryl/Modena, etc., Utah
 K21EZ-D in Price, Utah
 K21FD-D in Taos, etc., New Mexico
 K21FF-D in Holyoke, Colorado, on virtual channel 7, which rebroadcasts KMGH-TV
 K21FO-D in Winnemucca, Nevada
 K21FS-D in Eugene, Oregon
 K21FT-D in Myton, Utah
 K21FU-D in Topock, Arizona
 K21GE-D in Camp Verde, Arizona
 K21GI-D in Morongo Valley, California, on virtual channel 21
 K21GJ-D in Eureka, Nevada
 K21GN-D in Alexandria, Minnesota, on virtual channel 21
 K21GQ-D in Minot, North Dakota
 K21GT-D in Dove Creek, etc., Colorado, on virtual channel 21
 K21GU-D in Midland, Texas
 K21HF-D in Aspen, Colorado
 K21HH-D in Preston, Idaho, on virtual channel 14, which rebroadcasts KJZZ-TV
 K21HQ-D in Glendo, Wyoming
 K21HV-D in Malad, Idaho
 K21HX-D in Walker, Minnesota, on virtual channel 21, which rebroadcasts WFTC
 K21IA-D in Waipake, Hawaii
 K21IB-D in Circleville, Utah
 K21IC-D in Mount Pleasant, Utah, on virtual channel 5, which rebroadcasts KSL-TV
 K21IL-D in Apple Valley, Utah
 K21IM-D in Fort Sumner, New Mexico
 K21IN-D in Ridgecrest, etc., California, on virtual channel 9, which rebroadcasts KCAL-TV
 K21IR-D in Childress, Texas
 K21IT-D in Weatherford, Oklahoma
 K21IU-D in Navajo Mtn. Sch., etc., Utah
 K21IV-D in Oljeto, Utah
 K21IW-D in Mexican Hat, Utah
 K21IX-D in Montezuma Creek/Aneth, Utah
 K21JC-D in Pocatello, Idaho
 K21JI-D in Cave Junction, etc., Oregon
 K21JK-D in Montrose, Colorado
 K21JN-D in Erick, Oklahoma
 K21JQ-D in Walla Walla, Washington
 K21JS-D in Harrison, Arkansas
 K21JU-D in Meeteetse, Wyoming
 K21JV-D in Green River, Utah
 K21JX-D in Huntington, Utah
 K21JZ-D in Nephi, Utah, on virtual channel 4, which rebroadcasts KTVX
 K21KA-D in Ferndale, Montana
 K21KB-D in Brookings, Oregon
 K21KC-D in Bluff, etc., Utah
 K21KE-D in Canyonville, Oregon
 K21KF-D in Frost, Minnesota
 K21KI-D in Hatch, Utah
 K21KL-D in Rural Beaver County, Utah
 K21KY-D in Bigfork/Marcell, Minnesota
 K21LB-D in Lincoln City, Oregon
 K21LC-D in Cortez, Colorado
 K21LD-D in Mazama, Washington
 K21LI-D in Idaho Falls, Idaho
 K21LR-D in Alamogordo, New Mexico
 K21LW-D in Gazelle, California
 K21LY-D in Mapleton, Oregon
 K21MA-D in Emigrant, Montana
 K21MB-D in Scottsburg, Oregon
 K21MH-D in Daggett, California, on virtual channel 21
 K21MO-D in Riverside, California
 K21MP-D in Lawton, Oklahoma
 K21MR-D in Soda Springs, Idaho
 K21MS-D in La Grande, Oregon
 K21MT-D in Seiling, Oklahoma
 K21MU-D in Summit County, Utah
 K21MV-D in Farmington, New Mexico
 K21MW-D in Thompson Falls, Montana
 K21MX-D in Garfield, etc., Utah
 K21MY-D in Richfield, etc., Utah, on virtual channel 14, which rebroadcasts KJZZ-TV
 K21MZ-D in Koosharem, Utah
 K21NA-D in Bicknell & Teasdale, Utah
 K21NB-D in Rural Sevier County, Utah
 K21NC-D in Henrieville, Utah
 K21ND-D in Mayfield, Utah
 K21NE-D in Panguitch, Utah
 K21NF-D in Roseau, Minnesota
 K21NH-D in Laketown, etc., Utah, on virtual channel 9, which rebroadcasts KUEN
 K21NI-D in Wendover, Utah
 K21NK-D in Cedar City, Utah, on virtual channel 30, which rebroadcasts KUCW
 K21NN-D in Scipio/Holden, Utah
 K21NO-D in Leamington, Utah
 K21NP-D in Orangeville, Utah, on virtual channel 13, which rebroadcasts KSTU
 K21NQ-D in Meadview, Arizona
 K21NW-D in Tulia, Texas
 K21NZ-D in Anton, Colorado, on virtual channel 47
 K21OA-D in Holbrook, Idaho
 K21OB-D in Lake Charles, Louisiana
 K21OC-D in Corpus Christi, Texas
 K21OD-D in Many Farms, Arizona
 K21OF-D in Tucumcari, New Mexico
 K21OG-D in Bayfield, Colorado
 K21OH-D in Datil/Horse Springs, New Mexico
 K21OI-D in Mccook/Culbertson, Nebraska
 K21OJ-D in Ruth, Nevada
 K21OK-D in Lund & Preston, Nevada
 K21OM-D in Lafayette, Louisiana
 K21OO-D in South Eureka/Loleta, California
 K21OS-D in Beowawe, Nevada
 K21OT-D in Pasco-Kennewick, Washington
 K21OV-D in Redstone, Colorado
 K21OW-D in Lordsburg, New Mexico
 K21OY-D in Chico, California
 K21OZ-D in Shreveport, Louisiana
 K21PD-D in Columbia, Missouri
 K21PE-D in Tyler, Texas
 K21PI-D in Monterey, California
 K38LC-D in Olivia, Minnesota, on virtual channel 5, which rebroadcasts KSTP-TV
 K48DX-D in Sandpoint, Idaho
 KAID in Boise, Idaho
 KAJR-LD in Des Moines, Iowa
 KAKE in Wichita, Kansas
 KANG-LD in San Angelo, Texas, uses KEUS-LD's spectrum
 KCIB-LD in El Dorado, Arkansas
 KCNZ-CD in San Francisco, California, on virtual channel 28
 KDCK in Dodge City, Kansas
 KDEO-LD in Denver, Colorado, on virtual channel 23
 KDKW-LD in Lubbock, Texas
 KDLT-TV in Sioux Falls, South Dakota
 KDTV-CD in Santa Rosa, California, on virtual channel 28
 KDTX-TV in Dallas, Texas, on virtual channel 58
 KEJT-CD in Salt Lake City, Utah, on virtual channel 50, which rebroadcasts KTMW
 KEUS-LD in San Angelo, Texas
 KFCT in Fort Collins, Colorado, on virtual channel 22
 KFTV-DT in Hanford, California
 KGCS-LD in Joplin, Missouri
 KGCW in Burlington, Iowa
 KGHB-CD in Pueblo, etc., Colorado
 KGRF-LD in Gila River Indian Community, Arizona, on virtual channel 29, which rebroadcasts KGRQ-LD
 KGRQ-LD in Gila River Indian Community, Arizona, on virtual channel 29
 KHBB-LD in Helena, Montana
 KHBS in Fort Smith, Arkansas
 KHTX-LD in Huntsville, Texas, to move to channel 29, on virtual channel 30
 KKRP-LD in St. George, Utah, on virtual channel 13, which rebroadcasts KSTU
 KKSU-LD in Manhattan, Kansas
 KKTM-LD in Altus, Oklahoma
 KKYK-CD in Little Rock, Arkansas
 KLEI in Wailuku, Hawaii
 KLSV-LD in Las Vegas, Nevada
 KLUJ-TV in Harlingen, Texas
 KMLF-LD in Grand Island, Nebraska
 KMTP-TV in San Francisco, California, uses KCNZ-CD's spectrum, to move to channel 32 and to use KCNS' spectrum, on virtual channel 32
 KNBN in Rapid City, South Dakota
 KOFY-TV in San Francisco, California, uses KCNZ-CD's spectrum, on virtual channel 20
 KPMR in Santa Barbara, California
 KPXG-LD in Portland, Oregon, on virtual channel 42
 KQMK-LD in Lincoln, Nebraska
 KQRM-LD in Petaluma, California, uses KCNZ-CD's spectrum, on virtual channel 18
 KRFT-LD in Springfield, Missouri
 KRPO-LD in Quartzsite, Arizona
 KRVU-LD in Redding, California
 KRWB-TV in Roswell, New Mexico
 KRXI-TV in Reno, Nevada
 KSCE in El Paso, Texas
 KSPX-TV in Sacramento, California, on virtual channel 29
 KTAJ-TV in St. Joseph, Missouri, on virtual channel 16
 KTAV-LD in Los Angeles, California, on virtual channel 35
 KTBW-TV in Tacoma, Washington, on virtual channel 20
 KTVZ in Bend, Oregon
 KUGF-TV in Great Falls, Montana
 KUOT-CD in Oklahoma City, Oklahoma
 KWBA-TV in Sierra Vista, Arizona
 KWDA-LD in Dallas, Texas, to move to channel 4, on virtual channel 30
 KXAB-LD in Abilene, Texas
 KXAN-TV in Austin, Texas
 KYNM-CD in Albuquerque, New Mexico
 KYVE in Yakima, Washington
 KZJL in Houston, Texas, on virtual channel 61
 W21AU-D in Orlando, Florida, on virtual channel 21
 W21CL-D in Marathon, Florida, on virtual channel 8, which rebroadcasts WGEN-TV
 W21CP-D in Gloversville, New York
 W21CX-D in Mayaguez, Puerto Rico, on virtual channel 12, which rebroadcasts WOLE-DT
 W21DS-D in Sayner/Vilas County, Wisconsin
 W21DV-D in Bryson City, North Carolina
 W21EA-D in Parkersburg, West Virginia
 W21EB-D in Clarksburg, West Virginia
 W21EF-D in Waupaca, Wisconsin, on virtual channel 8
 W21EL-D in Valdosta, Georgia
 W21EO-D in Orono, Maine
 WABE-TV in Atlanta, Georgia
 WAPT in Jackson, Mississippi
 WAUT-LD in Auburn, Alabama
 WBNS-TV in Columbus, Ohio, on virtual channel 10
 WBRL-CD in Baton Rouge, Louisiana
 WCLF in Clearwater, Florida, on virtual channel 22
 WDAY-TV in Fargo, North Dakota
 WDHN in Dothan, Alabama
 WDRF-LD in Augusta, Georgia
 WDYB-CD in Daytona Beach, Florida, on virtual channel 14
 WEAE-LD in Springfield, Illinois
 WEBA-TV in Allendale, South Carolina
 WEDW in Stamford, Connecticut, on virtual channel 49
 WEEV-LD in Evansville, Indiana
 WEFG-LD in Philadelphia, Pennsylvania, on virtual channel 7
 WETU-LD in Montgomery, Alabama
 WEUX in Chippewa Falls, Wisconsin
 WFUP in Vanderbilt, Michigan
 WFXQ-CD in Springfield, Massachusetts, an ATSC 3.0 station
 WFYI in Indianapolis, Indiana, on virtual channel 20
 WGPS-LD in Fort Myers, Florida
 WHLZ-LD in Harrisburg, Pennsylvania
 WHNO in New Orleans, Louisiana
 WHWV-LD in Huntington, West Virginia
 WJEB-TV in Jacksonville, Florida
 WJKT in Jackson, Tennessee
 WJPX in San Juan, Puerto Rico, on virtual channel 24
 WJYS in Hammond, Indiana, on virtual channel 62
 WKME-CD in Kissimmee, Florida, on virtual channel 31, which rebroadcasts WTMO-CD
 WKMG-LD in Ocala, Florida
 WKSY-LD in Summerville/Trion, Georgia
 WKYT-TV in Lexington, Kentucky
 WMPT in Annapolis, Maryland, on virtual channel 22
 WNCR-LD in Tarboro, North Carolina, on virtual channel 41
 WNEP-TV in Scranton, Pennsylvania
 WPAN in Fort Walton Beach, Florida
 WPNT in Pittsburgh, Pennsylvania, an ATSC 3.0 station, on virtual channel 22
 WPXM-TV in Miami, Florida, on virtual channel 35
 WQDI-LD in Canton, Ohio, on virtual channel 20
 WRLW-CD in Salem, Indiana
 WROC-TV in Rochester, New York
 WSBK-TV in Boston, Massachusetts, on virtual channel 38
 WSEE-TV in Erie, Pennsylvania
 WSLF-LD in Port St. Lucie, Florida
 WTCV in San Juan, Puerto Rico, uses WJPX's spectrum, on virtual channel 18
 WTMH-LD in Macon, Georgia
 WTTO in Homewood, Alabama
 WUMN-LD in Minneapolis, Minnesota, on virtual channel 21
 WUNG-TV in Concord, North Carolina, on virtual channel 58
 WUXP-TV in Nashville, Tennessee, an ATSC 3.0 station, on virtual channel 30
 WVBT in Virginia Beach, Virginia
 WVIA-TV in Scranton, Pennsylvania, uses WNEP-TV's spectrum
 WWCW in Lynchburg, Virginia
 WWIW-LD in Raleigh, North Carolina, on virtual channel 66
 WWJ-TV in Detroit, Michigan, on virtual channel 62
 WZME in Bridgeport, Connecticut, uses WEDW's spectrum, on virtual channel 43
 WZPX-TV in Battle Creek, Michigan
 WZVI in Charlotte Amalie, U.S. Virgin Islands

The following stations, which are no longer licensed, formerly broadcast on digital channel 21 in the United States:
 K21CD-D in Ukiah, California
 K21EA-D in Lake Havasu City, Arizona
 K21KD-D in Wyola, Montana
 K21LV-D in Perryton, Texas
 K21MC-D in Hobbs, New Mexico
 K21NJ-D in Three Forks, Montana
 K21NL-D in Howard, Montana
 K21NX-D in Hermiston, Washington
 K21PC-D in Geronimo, Oklahoma
 KDUG-LD in Hemet, California
 KGRY-LD in Gila River Indian Community, Arizona
 KMIK-LD in Cedar Falls, Iowa
 W21DA-D in Dublin, Georgia
 W21DD-D in Naguabo, Puerto Rico
 WDLP-CD in Pompano Beach, Florida

References

21 digital